Chen Haoyu (born 7 April 1992) is a Chinese singer and actress.

Early life and education
Chen was born in Fuzhou, Fujian, on April 7, 1992. She was accepted to the Xiamen University of Technology in 2010 and two years later she became a new transfer student at Yuan Ze University in Taiwan.

Career
Chen first came to public attention in 2014 at the age of 22, appearing on Chinese Million Star and won the championship.

Chen made her film debut in youth romance film Summer of Meizhou (2015). That same year, she starred in the romantic comedy television series In Tale of Flower.
In 2017, she co-starred in the historical television series Royal Highness.

Chen gained recognition for her role as Consort Shu in the 2018 costume television series Ruyi's Royal Love in the Palace.
She also starred in the action campus drama Judo High.

In 2019, Chen starred in the fantasy historical drama Novoland: Eagle Flag.

In 2020, Chen starred in the youth romance drama I Don't Want To Be Friends With You, which received positive reviews.

Filmography

Film

Television series

References

1992 births
Living people
Chinese film actresses
Chinese television actresses
21st-century Chinese actresses
Actresses from Fuzhou